The Jicarilla Schoolhouse, in Jicarilla, New Mexico on New Mexico State Road 349 in Lincoln National Forest, was built in 1907.  It was listed on the National Register of Historic Places in 1983.

A one-room schoolhouse built of squared pine logs, it was in its time the most substantial building in the Jicarilla Mountains and was the pride of its community of homesteaders.

References

External links

		
National Register of Historic Places in Lincoln County, New Mexico
School buildings completed in 1907
Schools in New Mexico
One-room schoolhouses in New Mexico
School buildings on the National Register of Historic Places in New Mexico
Log buildings and structures in New Mexico
1907 establishments in New Mexico Territory